Peire Guilhem or Guillem may refer to:

Peire Guilhem de Luserna, troubadour
Peire Guillem de Tolosa, troubadour